Selen Pınar Işık, better known as PuCCa (born 3 June 1987), is a Turkish writer and Internet celebrity.

Life
Selen Pınar Işık was born in İzmir. She was 8 years old when her parents divorced, after which she lived with her mother for a while and experienced domestic violence at the hands of her stepfather. She later went to live with her father together with her sister. After graduating from Karşıyaka Girls High School, she moved from İzmir to Ankara to enroll in a university. During the period, she presented a radio program at a small station, and later started working as an editor for a television channel. She studied Radio, Television, Cinema and Journalism. During this period, she gained experience in blogging. She started to write on blogs and began to publish writings on Twitter as well. In 2010, she decided to turn her blog posts into a book and wrote Küçük Aptalın Büyük Dünyası. The book was adapted to a movie in 2014 under the name Hadi İnşallah.

In 2018, after posting a controversial tweet, her house was searched by the police. Although she stated that she was referring to her son Batı in her tweet, her house was searched by the authorities due to possible connections to terrorist groups and dispatching people towards rebellion. In the same year, she was arrested for encouraging drug use, and one of her tweets was cited as a reason for this action. In the case opened in 2019, she was sentenced to 7 years in prison, which was later reduced to 5 years and 10 months. She was also fined by the court to pay 66,660.

Bibliography
Küçük Aptalın Büyük Dünyası, 2010, Okuyan Us Publishing
Ve Geri Kalan Her Şey, 2011, Okuyan Us Publishing
Allah Beni Böyle Yaratmış, 2012, Okuyan Us Publishing
Ay Hadi İnşallah!, 2013, Okuyan Us Publishing
O Adam Buraya Gelecek, 2015, DEX
PuCCa Günlük - Pembe, 2016, DEX
PuCCa Günlük - Siyah, 2016, DEX
Şimdi Biz Neyiz?, 2017, DEX
Peki Ya Şimdi?, 2019, İndigo

References

External links

1987 births
Turkish bloggers
Turkish women bloggers
Turkish Internet celebrities
Turkish writers
Turkish women writers
People from Karşıyaka
Turkish columnists
Turkish women columnists
Living people
Turkish prisoners and detainees